Beacon Hill is a prime time period drama series which aired on CBS in 1975. Set after World War I in Boston's Beacon Hill area, the show was conceived as an Americanized version of the popular British series Upstairs, Downstairs (1971–1975) and focused on the wealthy Irish-American Lassiter family and their Irish immigrant servants, who reside together on Louisburg Square. 

The show was produced by Jacqueline Babbin and Beryl Vertue, the former literary agent of Upstairs, Downstairs co-creator Jean Marsh.

Production
The first episode cost $900,000 to produce, and the music was composed by Marvin Hamlisch. Christopher Schemering of The Soap Opera Encyclopedia called Beacon Hill "the most touted prime-time soap since the Lana Turner-George Hamilton debacle The Survivors". 

The series premiered on August 25, 1975, with an "impressive audience" of "43% of people watching TV" that evening, but it could not sustain those ratings. Schemering wrote that "the overly large cast and fragmented stories did not allow the audience to get its bearings." The show was cancelled after 11 weeks (two further episodes remained unaired) with its last episode airing on November 4, 1975.

Cast and characters
The show starred Stephen Elliott as patriarch Benjamin Lassiter, a self-made businessman and éminence grise at Boston City Hall, and Nancy Marchand as his wife Mary, an elegant society woman from a wealthy family. They have five children; eldest daughter Maude (Maeve McGuire), who is married to yachting enthusiast Richard Palmer (Edward Herrmann); middle daughter Emily (DeAnn Mears), who is married to stockbroker Trevor Bullock (Roy Cooper) and is the mother of the spoilt Betsy (Linda Purl); "plain jane" Rosamond (Kitty Winn), who helps out the family business; bohemian Fawn (Kathryn Walker), who is having an affair with her Italian piano teacher Giorgio Bellonci (Michael Nouri); and Robert, the Lassiters’ only son, who has returned from Frances after losing an arm in World War I.

The servants consist of Arthur Hacker (George Rose), the family butler; his wife Emmeline (Beatrice Straight), the head housekeeper; his niece Maureen Mahaffey (Susan Blanchard), who works as a maid; his nephew Brian Mallory (Paul Ryan Rudd), the chauffeur who is having an affair with Rosamond; former chauffeur Harry Emmet (Barry Snider); footman Terence O'Hara (David Rounds); cook William Piper (Richard Ward) and his son Grant (Don Blakely); Marilyn Gardiner (Holland Taylor), Mary's personal assistant and secretary; and maids Eleanor (Sydney Swire) and Kate (Lisa Pelican).

Episodes

References

External links
 

American television series based on British television series
CBS original programming
English-language television shows
1975 American television series debuts
1975 American television series endings
American television soap operas
Television shows set in Boston